Tony Wadsworth and Julie Wadsworth  (née Julie Mayer) are former English radio presenters who most recently worked for BBC Radio Leicester. In 2017, they were both jailed for historic child sexual abuse.

Marriage and radio careers
Tony Wadsworth was born in Leicester, and worked for a time in his family's business, before getting into broadcasting, presenting 'Weekdays with Waddo' on Radio Leicester. He met Julie Mayer while she was working as a seamstress and hired her to make a costume for a charity event. They were married in 1994. He moved to the BBC WM studios at Pebble Mill in Birmingham. Tony presented all the mainstream programmes including Breakfast and Drive. Alongside Julie, he also presented the regional Late Show. In 2005, they returned to his hometown and began broadcasting on BBC Radio Leicester. The Wadsworths presented there until their arrests in 2015.

Tony Wadsworth won several awards, including: a Sony award for the Best Local Radio Programme, a Gillard gold award for the Best Daytime Programme, a Gillard silver award for the reality radio soap series: The Street, and a Gillard bronze award for The Street Party. He was awarded an Honorary Degree of Doctor of Letters in 2012 by De Montfort University Leicester in recognition of his services to broadcasting and to the Leicestershire community. Julie once posed for a BBC-sanctioned Calendar Girls-style photoshoot to raise funds for Children in Need.

Child sexual abuse allegations and conviction

In January 2016, the Wadsworths went off air for "personal reasons", and in April 2016 it was announced that both were charged with historical child sex offences. Their trial at Warwick Crown Court began on 19 May 2017; the couple denied the charges. The charges mostly involved the couple luring young boys into sex with Julie while Tony acted as a "lookout". The incidents occurred between 1992 and 1996, when the boys were aged from 11 to 15. On 9 June 2017, they were convicted of indecently assaulting six under-age boys and outraging public decency. Each was jailed for five years.

Following their convictions, a spokesperson for the BBC stated that they no longer were employed by the corporation. De Montfort University revoked Tony Wadsworth's doctorate.

References

20th-century births
Year of birth missing (living people)
20th-century English criminals
21st-century English criminals
BBC radio presenters
English people convicted of indecent assault
Criminal duos
Criminals from Leicestershire
Living people
English people convicted of child sexual abuse
English prisoners and detainees
English radio DJs
Married couples
People from Leicester
Prisoners and detainees of England and Wales
Radio duos
People stripped of honorary degrees
Violence against men in the United Kingdom